Farnaz Fassihi (born 1971) is an Iranian-American journalist who has worked for The New York Times since 2019. She is the United Nations bureau chief and also writes about  Iranian news. Previously she was a senior writer for The Wall Street Journal for 17 years and a conflict reporter based in the Middle East.

Fassihi's memoir, Waiting for An Ordinary Day, is based on her four years covering the Iraq War and witnessing the unraveling of social life for Iraqi citizens.

Early life and education
Farnaz Fassihi was born in 1971 in the United States to Iranian parents. She grew up in Tehran, Iran, and Portland, Oregon in the US.

She earned a Master of Journalism from the Graduate School of Journalism at Columbia University in New York City.

Career

Early career
Fassihi worked as an investigative reporter and roving foreign correspondent for The Star-Ledger of Newark, New Jersey. She covered the September 11 attacks on the World Trade Center, the war in Afghanistan, Second Palestinian Intifada and Iraq under Saddam Hussein for The Star-Ledger. She was also a reporter for The Providence Journal in Rhode Island covering local news. She led the paper's award-winning coverage of the crash of Egypt Air flight 990, traveling to Cairo to investigate the story.

She worked as a stringer for Western media organizations in Iran, including The New York Times at the age of 19, when she was studying in Iran.

The Wall Street Journal
Fassahi spent 17 years covering wars and uprisings across the Middle East as a senior writer and war correspondent for The Wall Street Journal, based Baghdad, Iraq, and then in Beirut, Lebanon, from 2003 to 2006, as deputy bureau chief for Middle East and Africa.  She was sent to Afghanistan to cover the US-led invasion there, and covered  topics such as elections in Zimbabwe, war in Gaza and the Arab Spring protests. She was one of the lead reporters for The Journals 2011 award-winning investigative project titled "Censorship Inc.," a series of enterprise stories examining how western technology enabled censorship in authoritarian countries.

In 2004 she became more widely known, after a private email she had written to family and friends about the deteriorating situation in Iraq went viral on the Internet. It included criticism of U.S. activities in Iraq, saying "The genie of terrorism, chaos, and mayhem has been unleashed... as a result of American mistakes".  It was published in newspapers, websites and blogs around the world and became the subject of a Doonesbury cartoon. The email later became the kernel of her book about life in Iraq for ordinary Iraqis, Waiting for an Ordinary Day (2008), and was published in full in the book.

Moving back to the United States, she worked in WSJs Washington, D.C. office from 2015 to 2019, covering  US foreign policy and diplomacy at the United Nations. She wrote about U.S. foreign policy and global diplomacy of some of the biggest stories: the missile crisis with North Korea, Myanmar's ethnic cleansing of the Rohingya minority, Venezuela's political upheaval, the Syrian civil war, Iran's nuclear deal, the refugee crisis and climate change.

The New York Times
Fassihi joined The New York Times as a reporter in July 2019, based in New York City.

Fassihi reported in November 2019 uprising in Iran and broke the story of the massacre of people in Mahshahr, reconstructing in detail how the Islamic Revolutionary Guards Corps shot down  Ukraine International Airlines Flight 752, a passenger plane, with missiles on a night that the U.S. and Iran went to the brink of war, and lied about it for three days.

Also in November 2019, Fassihi was one of the reporters on a joint investigative project, "The Iran Cables", between the NY Times and The Intercept about a find of intelligence cables revealing how Iran wields influence in Iraq.

In October 2020, Fassihi's investigation into Iran's MeToo movement revealed allegations of sexual misconduct against prominent artist Aydin Aghdashloo.

In August 2021, it was reported that Fassihi had been the target of a series of cyber attacks and violent threats by certain Iranian opposition groups and internet trolls over several months. She was doxxed and threatened with death and rape. The New York Times put out a statement on Twitter on August 6 in support of her. The Coalition For Women In Journalism condemned the attacks, which they called "deeply gendered and misogynistic".

In October 2021, Fassihi and the New York Times were accused and called out in an open letter by critics for "fake news" reports for "[denial of (DARVO)] and normalizing Iranian government brutality", which The New York Times Editorial board, public relations and Fassihi rebutted in an official public statement.

In April 2022, The New York Times announced that Fassihi would be covering the United Nations in addition to continuing to cover Iran.

Recognition and awards

 2000: For EgyptAir Flight 990 crash
 The New England News Executive Award-First place for General News category
 Livingston Award for young journalists—Finalist
 2006: For Iraq coverage
 Henry Pringle Lecture Award—Columbia University's Graduate School of Journalism for reporting with the most impact in shaping policy in Washington. Fassihi is the youngest person honored with the award.
 2011: For "Censorship Inc." (Team award)
 Malcolm Forbes Award—The Overseas Press Club's Best International Business Reporting 
 Investigate Award—from Society of American Business Editors and Writers
 2010: For "Hearts, Minds and Blood: the battle for Iran"
 Robert F. Kennedy Award for best international reporting in print
 Overseas Press Club's Hal Boyle Award—for Best newspaper or news service reporting from abroad
 Payne Award for Ethics in Journalism from University of Oregon
 Taylor Family Award for Fairness and Accuracy in print Journalism from Harvard University
 Sigma Delta Chi Award for Best International Reporting from The Society of Professional Journalists
 National Journalism Award for Best Reporting in Print from the Asian American Journalists Association
 2015: Career Award for coverage of Middle East
 The Marie Colvin Front Page Award for Foreign Correspondence
2015: Nieman fellow at Harvard University
2018: recipient of an Ellis Island Medal of Honor for distinguished contribution to American society

Other roles
Fassihi's essays on the subject of journalism, conflict reporting and courage have been published by Harvard University's Nieman Reports magazine and Columbia Journalism Review. She has been a guest speaker at numerous panels and journalism classes and a commentator for television and radio news shows on CNN, MSNBC, BBC, WNYC, PBS, Charlie Rose and National Public Radio in the United States.

Fassihi has served as a judge for the annual Overseas Press Club's awarda, and as of September 2021 was serving on the OPC board.

She was a member of the Dag Hammarskjöld Fund For Journalists board for four years, and of the United Nations Correspondents Association from 2017 to 2019. She is also a member of the New York Chapter of the Iranian American Women Foundation, a non-partisan, non-political network of professional Iranian women. Fassihi is active in the organization's mentorship program and mentors a young female Iranian journalist each year.

She was selected by Microsoft Teams in 2019 as a leader to be featured in a documentary called Art of the Team, which featured a group of a dozen leaders from different fields, including scientists, Olympic athletes, CEOs and designers. Microsoft Teams uses Fassihi's interview in training sessions for corporations for team building and conflict resolution.

Books

Monograph
 Waiting for An Ordinary Day: the Unraveling of Life in Iraq (2008)—Fassihi's memoir of four years spent covering the Iraq war, and its impact on ordinary Iraqis

Contributing author
 Women's Letters, America from the Revolutionary War to the Present—Fassihi's famous email from Iraq is included in this anthology of historical letters written by American women.
 What Orwell Didn’t Know, Propaganda and the New Face of American Politics—Fassihi contributed an essay about the Iraq War and US administration's propaganda.
 Eating Mud Crabs in Kandahar: Stories of Food during Wartime by the World's Leading Correspondents—Fassihi contributed a chapter on sharing meals in Iran with student activists.

References

American women journalists
American people of Iranian descent
Iranian journalists
The Wall Street Journal people
University of Tehran alumni
1971 births
Living people
Lake Oswego High School alumni
21st-century American women